Michael Breen (born May 22, 1961) is an American play-by-play sports commentator for NBA on ABC and is the lead announcer for New York Knicks games on the MSG Network. Breen also calls NBA games for ESPN and was formerly a play-by-play announcer for the New York Giants' preseason games. Breen also called regular NFL season games for both NFL on Fox and NFL on NBC. Breen has been the lead play-by-play announcer for the NBA Finals on ABC since 2006.

Biography

Early life
Breen was raised in Yonkers, New York and attended St. Paul the Apostle Catholic grammar school. He is a 1979 graduate of Salesian High School, and a 1983 graduate of Fordham University.

Basketball
As of the 2021–22 NBA season, Breen is currently in his 30th season as an NBA broadcaster, with some of those 30 taking place while Breen worked for NBC up until 2002, the network's last year as both an NBA and WNBA broadcaster. He is also the main voice for New York Knicks games on MSG Network.

Breen first worked with the Knicks as a radio announcer for WFAN from 1992 to 1997, when he was promoted to television play-by-play upon Marv Albert's firing following his infamous sex scandal. He later became Albert's backup upon his return in 1999, before finally becoming the lead play-by-play upon Albert's second dismissal in 2004. On February 8, 2006, with the departure of Al Michaels from the network, ABC announced that Breen would take over as the lead broadcaster for the NBA, including the NBA Finals. His broadcasting career started doing play-by-play for the Marist College Red Foxes basketball team in 1985. Other than his role as ABC's main play-by-play on Saturday nights, Breen usually works for ESPN on Fridays and occasionally on Wednesdays, usually calling games alongside Mark Jackson and Jeff Van Gundy, with the rest of his schedule reserved for MSG. He has also called college basketball games for ESPN.

Breen is known for yelling the word "BANG!" (or others such as "It's good!" or "Puts it in!") after a key shot is made, usually very late in the game. Famous "Bang!" calls include Stephen Curry's game-winning 38-foot three-point shot vs. Oklahoma City in February 2016, Ray Allen's game-tying shot against San Antonio in Game 6 of the 2013 NBA Finals, and Luka Doncic’s game-winning buzzer-beater in overtime against the Clippers in the 2020 playoffs. Mike Breen's famous "BANG!" call originated from his time at Fordham University. Breen explains that as a fan in the stands, he used to yell "BANG!" when a player would nail a big shot. He then decided to test the saying out in the booth when announcing games; he got an immediate positive reaction and stuck with it all throughout his career, making it his trademark and creating a legacy for himself.

When the Knicks made the 2011 NBA Playoffs, Breen did not call any of the games for MSG due to his involvement with ESPN and ABC; he did call Games 3 (with the MSG broadcasts handled by Kenny Albert) and 4 for ESPN and ABC, respectively.

Some of Breen's current and past broadcast partners were employed with the Knicks at one point. The list includes former Knicks head coaches Hubie Brown and Jeff Van Gundy, former Knicks players Mark Jackson and Walt Frazier, and former Knicks radio color announcer John Andariese. While working alongside Bill Walton on ESPN, Breen was on hand for the infamous Pacers–Pistons brawl (dubbed "The Malice at the Palace") on November 19, 2004. Two seasons later, Breen was on hand for the Knicks–Nuggets brawl with MSG Network on December 16, 2006.

In addition, he was also the voice of the NBA Live, beginning with NBA Elite 11, alongside his usual ESPN partners Mark Jackson and Jeff Van Gundy. However, the series was canceled indefinitely. He did voice along with Van Gundy in the NBA Live series beginning with NBA Live 14 through NBA Live 18. Following NBA Live 18, Breen and Van Gundy were replaced by Ed Cohen and Jay Williams.

Providing emphasis on how important to the basketball community Breen has been, on May 14, 2021, he was inducted into the Naismith Memorial Basketball Hall of Fame. Not only this, but Breen was awarded the Curt Gowdy Media Award. These are two of the most prestigious accolades someone in this field can attain. When presented with the Curt Gowdy Media Award, Breen stated in his acceptance speech, “I’ve had this enormous privilege to call so many great moments in NBA history, but the best part, the best part, has always been the lifetime of friendships that the game has given me.”

Olympics
Breen has announced in five Olympic Games during his career, one Winter Olympics and four Summer Olympics. At the 1996 Summer Olympics in Atlanta, the 2000 Summer Olympics in Sydney, and the 2004 Summer Olympics in Athens, Breen called basketball, handling play-by-play for both the men and the women. At the 2002 Winter Olympics in Salt Lake City, Breen called ski jumping. Breen served as a play-by-play announcer for NBC Sports coverage of men's and women's Basketball at the 2008 Summer Olympics.

Radio
Breen has been a fixture on the radio as well. He began his professional radio career as a sportscaster on WNBC radio in the early 1980s, and frequently substituted for Dave Sims as host of "SportsNight" on the station. From 1988 to 2000, Breen did the sports segment on the WFAN and nationally syndicated Imus in the Morning talk/comedy radio show. Breen became noted for his deadpan delivery of false sports news, such as in the mid-1990s reporting that in the previous night's Mets game, "Félix Millán went 4-for-4 with 3 runs scored" (Millán retired in 1977).

Personal life
Breen resides on Long Island, New York with his wife Rosanne and their three children, Michael, Nicole, and Matt. He is Catholic.

References

External links

Under The Radar with Mike Breen at NBA.COM
Mike Breen ESPN Biography

1961 births
Living people
American radio sports announcers
American television sports announcers
College basketball announcers in the United States
Fordham University alumni
National Basketball Association broadcasters
National Football League announcers
New York Giants announcers
New York Knicks announcers
Olympic Games broadcasters
Sportspeople from New York City
Women's National Basketball Association announcers
WFUV people